Ricardo Alexandre dos Santos (born June 24, 1976 in Passos),  or simply Ricardinho, is a former Brazilian footballer who played as defensive midfielder.

Club statistics

National team statistics

Honours
Minas Gerais State League: 1994, 1996, 1997, 1998
Brazilian Cup: 1996, 2000
Libertadores Cup: 1997
Brazilian Center-West Cup: 1999
Recopa: 1999
South Minas Cup: 2001, 2002
Minas Gerais State Superleague: 2002

Personal Honours
Brazilian Bola de Prata (Placar): 2000

Contract
5 July 2007 to 5 January 2009

References

External links
 placar 
 
 

 websoccerclub 
 soccerterminal 

1976 births
Living people
Brazilian footballers
Brazilian expatriate footballers
Campeonato Brasileiro Série A players
Cruzeiro Esporte Clube players
Kashiwa Reysol players
Kashima Antlers players
J1 League players
J2 League players
Expatriate footballers in Japan
Sport Club Corinthians Paulista players
Brazil international footballers
Sportspeople from Minas Gerais
Association football midfielders